Leser is the surname of:

Benno Max Leser-Lasario, Austrian physician, singer and breathing instructor
C. E. V. Leser (1915–1998), German-born econometrician
Edmund Leser (1828–1916), German surgeon (Leser–Trélat sign)
Emanuel Leser (1849–1914), German economist
Ludwig Leser (1890–1946), Austrian politician
Norbert Leser (1933–2014), Austrian social philosopher
Oscar Leser (Leser v. Garnett, 1922)
Paul Leser (1899–1984), German-born American ethnologist
Tina Leser (1910–1986), American fashion designer